Leslee Hill is an American Republican Party politician who served as a member of the Connecticut House of Representatives from the 17th district from 2019 to 2021. Hill was first elected in 2018, narrowly defeating Democrat Eleni Kavros DeGraw, who she would later lose to in 2020. Hill served on the House's Education Committee, Finance, Revenue, and Bonding Committee, and Judiciary Committee.

References

Living people
Republican Party members of the Connecticut House of Representatives
People from Canton, Connecticut
21st-century American politicians
Year of birth missing (living people)